Tony Naden is a British lexicographer who specializes on Western Oti-Volta subgroup of Gur languages. He has compiled dictionaries in the following languages: Dagbanli, Mampelle, Mõõré, Nabt, Talene, KaMara and Yarsi.

Publications

References

Year of birth missing (living people)
Living people
Lexicographers
Linguists of Dagbani